A displacement field is an assignment of displacement vectors for all points in a region or body that is displaced from one state to another. A displacement vector specifies the position of a point or a particle in reference to an origin or to a previous position. For example, a displacement field may be used to describe the effects of deformation on a solid body.

Before considering displacement, the state before deformation must be defined. It is a state in which the coordinates of all points are known and described by the function:

where
 is a placement vector
 are all the points of the body
 are all the points in the space in which the body is present

Most often it is a state of the body in which no forces are applied.

Then given any other state of this body in which coordinates of all its points are described as  the displacement field is the difference between two body states:

where  is a displacement field, which for each point of the body specifies a displacement vector.

See also
Stress

References

Continuum mechanics
Materials science
Vector physical quantities